Europa was an Italian daily newspaper published in Italy.

History and profile
Europa was first published on 12 February 2003. The paper was started as the official press organ of the political party Democracy is Freedom – The Daisy. After the merger of the party to form the Democratic Party, the newspaper remained in the availability of the party.

The 2012 circulation of the paper was 3,000 copies.

Europa ceased publication on 31 October 2014.

References

External links
Official website (in Italian).

2003 establishments in Italy
Publications established in 2003
Newspapers published in Rome
Italian-language newspapers
Daily newspapers published in Italy